Cocktail Mixxx is a remix album released on March 6, 2007 by the Revolting Cocks on 13th Planet Records.  All of the original songs can be found on the band's previous album, Cocked and Loaded, and are remixed in their order of appearance on the promotional issue of that album, with "Fire Engine" having a second remix appear at the end. Original member Luc van Acker and longtime contributor Phildo Owens remixed a track each on the record, but the other nine tracks were remixed by Clayton Worbeck. The second remix of "Fire Engine" features Josh Bradford on vocals.

Track listing

Personnel
See original album credits to Cocked and Loaded
Clayton Worbeck - remixing (2-4, 6-11)
Luc van Acker - remixing (1, 5)
Phildo Owens - remixing (5)
Josh Bradford - vocals (11)

References

Revolting Cocks albums
2007 remix albums
Albums produced by Al Jourgensen
Industrial remix albums